Lambird is a surname. Notable people with the surname include: 

Mona Salyer Lambird (1938–1999), American lawyer
Robyn Lambird (born 1997), Australian wheelchair racer and model